Ihsan Isik is a tenured professor of international banking and finance at the Department of Accounting and Finance, Rohrer College of Business, Rowan University, Glassboro, NJ. He serves as the Director of International Affairs for the Rohrer COB since June 2013. Ihsan Isik received his B.S. in Management with high honors from the Middle East Technical University, (Ankara, Turkey, 1992), his M.S. in Finance from Texas Tech University, (Lubbock, Texas, 1995), his M.A. in Economics (1997) and his Ph.D. in Financial Economics from University of New Orleans (New Orleans, Louisiana, 2000).

Ihsan Isik serves as the founding Chairman and CEO of the American Turkish Chamber of Commerce (ATCOM), New Jersey, USA. ATCOM is cited as a Gulenist organization. Ihsan Isik was listed as the lead petitioner of the Lyceum Charter School Project reported as a Gulenist K-12 school. Ihsan Isik is a member of the International Financial Management Association and a research fellow of the EU funded Economic Research Forum (ERF). Ihsan Isik is married with twin daughters and resides in New Jersey, USA.

References

External links
Rowan University's faculty biography
Ihsan Isik's Publications

Rowan University faculty
Living people
Year of birth missing (living people)